The Progressive Conservative Party of Ontario fielded a full slate of 125 candidates in the 1975 Ontario general election. The party, which had been in power since 1943, won a plurality victory with fifty-one seats and led a minority government for the next two years.

Candidates

Source for election results: Election Results, Elections Ontario, accessed 2 November 2021.

References

1975